Camille Mattart (1886-1957) was a revolutionary trade unionist and militant anarcho-communist.

In 1904, he was a deputy treasurer of the Friendly Federation of Anarchists of Belgium. He collaborated with L'Insurgé and L'Action Directe, an organ of the Belgian CGT. On 11–12 June 1905, he participated in the revolutionary trade union congress of Charleroi, where the bases of the Belgian CGT were drawn up. In 1908, he was administrator of the newspaper L’Avant-Garde. Before World War I he collaborated with L'Émancipateur, a revolutionary anarchist communist organ published by the group Les Chercheurs de rire. In 1919, he contributed to the newspaper Le Communiste. In Flémalle he took over the editorial staff of L'Émancipateur which became Le Combat. He organized the purchase of printing equipment in 1929. He participated in the Anarchist Union and the Federation of Anarchist Groups. With J. Ledoux and Hem Day, at the end of the 1920s, he led the Belgian Group for the Right of Asylum. Camille Mattart contributed to the Publications de la Révolte et des Temps nouvelles by Jean Grave.

He died in  Liège in 1957.

References

Further reading 
 Didier Karolinski, Le mouvement anarchiste en Wallonie et à Bruxelles, mémoire de licence, Université de Liège, 1983.

External links 

 

1886 births
1957 deaths
Belgian anarchists
Belgian journalists
Print journalists
Belgian trade unionists
Belgian communists
Belgian newspaper publishers (people)